Mainburg is a town in the district of Kelheim, in Bavaria, Germany. It is situated on the river Abens, 30 km northwest of Landshut and 30 km southeast of Ingolstadt.

Mainburg borders four communities; Aiglsbach, Elsendorf, Attenhofen, and Volkenschwand. The town has 15,163 residents, the third largest in its district.

References